Elisa Serramià Neundorf (born 7 September 1984) is a Spanish professional golfer who played on the Ladies European Tour and the U.S-based LPGA Tour. She won British Ladies Amateur in 2003 and was LET Rookie of the Year in 2005.

Amateur career
Serramià was member of the National Team between 2001 and 2004, and was part of the Spanish teams that won the European Girls' Team Championship in 2001 and the European Ladies' Team Championship in 2003. She represented Europe at the 2002 Junior Solheim Cup and the 2003 Vagliano Trophy, and Spain at the 2004 Espirito Santo Trophy together with María Hernández and Beatriz Recari.

Serramià won the 2003 British Ladies Amateur earning a spot at the 2003 Women's British Open, where she was the low amateur. In 2004, she won the French International Lady Juniors Amateur Championship and was runner-up at the European Ladies Amateur Championship.

Professional career
Serramià turned professional in late 2004 and joined the Ladies European Tour in 2005, where she finished tied 7th in her first tournament, the Samsung Ladies Masters in Singapore, and ended the season LET Rookie of the Year. In 2006, she was T3 at the Ladies Italian Open and T4 at the Open De España Femenino, to finish 32nd on the Order of Merit.

In 2009, Serramià joined the Symetra Tour, where she made 11 out of 14 cuts and won her first professional title, the Mercedes-Benz of Kansas City Championship. She was successful at the 2011 LPGA Final Qualifying Tournament and joined the LPGA Tour in 2012.

Amateur wins 
2003 British Ladies Amateur
2004 French International Lady Juniors Amateur Championship

Professional wins (1)

Symetra Tour (1)
2009 Mercedes-Benz of Kansas City Championship

Team appearances
Amateur
European Girls' Team Championship (representing Spain): 2001 (winners)
Junior Solheim Cup (representing Europe): 2002
Vagliano Trophy (representing the Continent of Europe): 2003
European Ladies' Team Championship (representing Spain): 2003 (winners)
European Lady Junior's Team Championship (representing Spain): 2002, 2004 (winners)
Espirito Santo Trophy (representing Spain): 2004

References

Spanish female golfers
Ladies European Tour golfers
LPGA Tour golfers
Sportspeople from Barcelona
1984 births
Living people
20th-century Spanish women
21st-century Spanish women